Equinox Group is an American luxury fitness company which operates several  lifestyle brands: Equinox, Equinox Hotels, Precision Run, Project by Equinox, Equinox Explore, Equinox Media, Furthermore, Pure Yoga, Blink Fitness, and SoulCycle. Within the portfolio of brands, there are more than 300 locations in major cities in the United States, as well as in London, Toronto, and Vancouver. The global headquarters is in New York City, where there are currently 35 Equinox clubs. Equinox Group also has a digital platform, the Equinox+ App, that provides access to digital classes. Equinox is owned by a group of investors including Harvey Spevak, executive chairman and managing partner, as well as principals of The Related Companies.

History 
The first Equinox location opened on  September 23, 1991  in Manhattan's Upper West Side. It was  started by the Errico family. In 2000, Spevak led a management buyout of Equinox to two private equity firms, North Castle Partners and J.W. Childs. In 2006, he partnered with Related Chairman principals to acquire a controlling interest in Equinox and secured a significant minority investment from private equity firm L Catterton in 2017.

In 2008, Equinox brought Pure Yoga to the United States from Hong Kong. In 2011, Equinox launched Blink, a separate fitness company, and acquired SoulCycle. In July 2019, Equinox launched Equinox Hotels in Hudson Yards, Manhattan.

Employment practices controversy 
A 2019 article in The New York Times reported that trainers often worked long hours, sometimes as many as 80 a week, forcing some to sleep in employee locker rooms or their cars between shifts. Former and current trainers also described intense pressure from the company to recruit and retain clients drawn from the club's members.

The company settled out of court two lawsuits in California in 2013, both related to unpaid overtime for trainers.

January 2023 ban on new members 
A 2023 marketing move by Equinox to ban people from setting up new fitness memberships on January 1 received widespread criticism. The company said the purpose of the campaign was to "snub short-term resolutions".

References

External links 
 

Health care companies established in 1991
American companies established in 1991
Health clubs in the United States
Companies based in New York City
Medical and health organizations based in New York City
1991 establishments in New York City
2006 mergers and acquisitions